"Love Is Requited" is a single from Italian singer Elisa. The lyrics of the song were written by Michele von Buren and the music by Andrea Guerra for the film Someday This Pain Will Be Useful to You. It is Elisa's third single, after "Almeno tu nell'universo" and "Gli ostacoli del cuore", in which the singer-songwriter is only the singer.

The song was available for the first time on the iTunes Store USA on November 15, 2011, which precedes the arrival of the album Steppin' On Water, which was released on 13 March 2012 in the United States.

In June 2012, the song received a Nastro d'Argento for Best Original Song.

References

2011 singles
Elisa (Italian singer) songs
English-language Italian songs
Sugar Music singles
Songs written for films